Gordon Boyd (born 27 March 1958) is a Scottish former professional footballer who is best known for his time with Rangers.

Career
Boyd played for amateur boys clubs Glasgow United AFC and Eastercraigs AFC before he was signed by Rangers as a 12-year-old in 1970. He became the youngest ever player to sign Scottish Football Association schoolboy forms for Rangers. An under 15 Scottish schoolboy international, in 1974-75 Boyd played for the Scotland under-18 team in a European Championship match against Denmark at Rugby Park, Kilmarnock. The following year (1975–76) Boyd helped the Scotland under-18s, managed by Andy Roxburgh, win a tournament in Cannes. Scotland beat Finland and Italy and drew with Brazil in the group phase. Boyd then scored the only goal in the final, as Scotland won against the host nation France.

Boyd also had spells with Fulham, Barnsley and Scunthorpe United, but never fulfilled his early potential. He finished his playing career at semi professional non-league Goole Town in 1986.

References

External links

Scottish footballers
1958 births
Living people
Rangers F.C. players
Greenock Morton F.C. players
Fulham F.C. players
Barnsley F.C. players
Scunthorpe United F.C. players
Goole Town F.C. players
Scotland youth international footballers
Scottish Football League players
English Football League players
Association football midfielders
Footballers from Glasgow